The Old Academy  (German: Alte Akademie), also called Wilhelminum, is a building in the center of Munich, Germany. Dating from the 16th century, it has a Renaissance facade and four inner courtyards.

History 
William V, Duke of Bavaria ordered the construction of a building for the college and the school of the Jesuits  next to his St. Michael's Church. The college was established 1583–1590.  It is unclear who designed the building, but it was probably  as Friedrich Sustris. 

After the expulsion of the Jesuits in 1773 the building became a cantonment for cadets of the army. From 1783 to 1826, it housed the Court Library and Archives, and then a school of painting and sculpture (hence the designation "Academy"). From 1826 to 1840, the Ludwig Maximilian University had its temporary domicile in the building. After severe destruction during the Second World War (1944) it was rebuilt by Josef Wiedemann to house the Bavarian Statistical Office.

See also
 List of Jesuit sites

Buildings and structures completed in 1590
Buildings and structures in Munich
Renaissance architecture in Munich
Renaissance architecture in Germany